The Västra Götaland Regional Council, or, Region Västra Götaland, or Västra Götalandsregionen, is the devolved regional council of Västra Götaland County in Sweden. It was created in 1999 by the merger of the county councils of Gothenburg and Bohus, Älvsborg, and Skaraborg Counties coupled with the devolution of power from the County administrative boards of the same counties, that also merged. Its main responsibilities are the public healthcare system and public transport.

Parliament 
The Regional Parliament is located in Vänersborg. Election results 2018:

See also 
Sahlgrenska University Hospital
NU Hospital Group
Västtrafik
Politics of Sweden
Elections in Sweden

References

External links 
Official website of Västra Götaland Regional Council

County Councils of Sweden
Västra Götaland County